Tintaya (Quechua for the cocoon which contains the chrysalis of the moth) is a  mountain in the Wansu mountain range in the Andes of Peru. It is located in the Arequipa Region, La Unión Province, Puyca District. Tintaya lies west of Yuraq Punta.

References 

Mountains of Arequipa Region